A Public Space is a nonprofit triquarterly English-language literary magazine based in Brooklyn, New York. First published in April 2006, A Public Space publishes fiction, poetry, essays and art. The magazine's Focus portfolios have examined the writing of a different country each issue, covering the literature of Japan, Russia, and Peru in Issues 1-3.

History and profile
The magazine was founded in 2005 by Brigid Hughes, former Executive Editor of The Paris Review. The magazine is published quarterly. In its debut issue in 2006, Hughes stated that the journal's mission was to be "“A literary forum for the stories behind the news, a fragment of an overheard conversation, a peek at the novel the person next to you on the subway is reading, the life you invent for the man in front of you at the supermarket checkout line.  Ideas and stories about the things that confront us, amuse us, confound us, intrigue us.”

Marilynne Robinson, Jesmyn Ward, Haruki Murakami, Charles D'Ambrosio, Rick Moody, Anna Deavere Smith, Kelly Link, Sreyash Sarkar, Daniel Alarcón, Juan Manuel Chavez, Santiago Roncagliolo, Miguel Gutierrez, Jillian Weise, Keith Lee Morris, Jonathan Lethem, Martha Cooley, Anne Carson, Delia Falconer, David Levi Strauss, Nam Le, Ander Monson, Maile Chapman, Antoine Wilson and Garth Greenwell have all contributed.

Awards
A Public Space was named Best New Literary Magazine by The Village Voice in December 2006. In 2011, Brigid Hughes received the PEN/Nora Magid Award for Magazine Editing for "her commitment to quality literature and for her larger purpose." In 2018, the magazine received the inaugural Whiting Literary Magazine Prize in the print category for its "gorgeously curated collection we experience as a cabinet of wonders."

See also
List of literary magazines

References

External links
 

Literary magazines published in the United States
Quarterly magazines published in the United States
Magazines established in 2005
Magazines published in New York (state)